Qusheh Cheshmeh (also Romanized as Qūsheh Cheshmeh; also known as Qūsh Cheshmeh) is a village in Qaravolan Rural District, Loveh District, Galikash County, Golestan Province, Iran. At the 2006 census, its population was 375, in 74 families.

References 

Populated places in Galikash County